Vibratory sensation is the sense of vibration, and may refer to:
Vibration as a modality of cutaneous receptors (on the skin), referred to as pallesthesia.
Hearing, which is sensation of air vibrations